Joseph Sabine FRS (6 June 1770 – 24 January 1837) was an English lawyer, naturalist and writer on horticulture.

Life and work

Sabine was born into a prominent Anglo-Irish family in Tewin, Hertfordshire, the eldest son of Joseph Sabine. His younger brother was Sir Edward Sabine.

Sabine practised law until 1808, when he was appointed Inspector General of Taxes, a position he held until 1835. He had a lifelong interest in natural history and was an original fellow of the Linnean Society, elected on 7 November 1779.
Sabine was honorary secretary of the Royal Horticultural Society from 1810 to 1830, and treasurer, and received their gold medal for organising the accounts left in a state of disarray by Richard Anthony Salisbury. The society's gardens at Hammersmith, then Chiswick, were established under his guidance. He sent David Douglas and others to collect specimens, and initiated local societies as extensions of the society. He contributed around forty papers for their Transactions, on garden flowers and vegetables. His management of the accounts led to large debts, and after a threat of censure by a committee he resigned in 1830.

Sabine then focused on the position of secretary and vice-chairman of the Zoological Society of London, significantly increasing their collection of animals. He was a recognised authority on the moulting, migration, and habit of British birds. He was elected a Fellow of the Royal Society in November 1799.

Edward Sabine was a member of John Ross's Arctic voyage in 1818. He sent Joseph a specimen of a new gull which had been discovered during the expedition, which Joseph named Sabine's gull (Larus sabini) in honour of his brother.

Sabine died in Mill Street, Hanover Square, London, on 24 Jan. 1837, and was buried in Kensal Green Cemetery on 1 February. There is a lithograph of him after a portrait by Eddis, and his name was commemorated by de Candolle for a leguminous genus Sabinea.

List of selected publications

References

1770 births
1837 deaths
People from East Hertfordshire District
18th-century British botanists
Botanists with author abbreviations
English zoologists
Fellows of the Royal Society
Fellows of the Linnean Society of London
Burials at Kensal Green Cemetery
19th-century British botanists